A personal air vehicle (PAV) is a proposed type of aircraft providing on-demand aviation services.

The emergence of this alternative to traditional ground transport methods has been enabled by unmanned aerial vehicle technologies and electric propulsion.
Barriers include aviation safety, airworthiness, operating costs, usability, airspace integration, aircraft noise and emissions, tackled first by small UAS certification then experience.

Definition 
The personal air vehicle (PAV) is intended to provide flight convenience similar to the private car in terms of accessibility and ease of operation, while also offering the speed and routing efficiencies made possible by direct point-to-point flight. The PAV differs from conventional general aviation types and flying cars in being usable by people with no pilot qualifications.

History
NASA established the Personal Air Vehicle Sector Project in 2002, as part of their Vehicle Systems Program (VSP). This project was part of the NASA Vehicle Integration, Strategy, and Technology Assessment (VISTA) office, which also included sectors for Subsonic Transports, VTOL Aircraft, Supersonic Aircraft, and High Altitude Long Endurance Aircraft.  The objective of each sector was to establish vehicle capability goals and the required technology investment strategies to achieve those breakthroughs. 

The difference in vehicle characteristics between PAVs and existing General Aviation single engine piston aircraft was set out in 2003 at an American Institute of Aeronautics and Astronautics (AIAA) conference. Advanced concepts would be needed to dramatically enhance ease of use, safety, efficiency, field length performance, and affordability.

In 2006 the VSP was replaced by new NASA Aeronautics initiatives. PAV technology development efforts at NASA shifted to a prize-based investment, with NASA Centennial Challenge Prize funds of $250,000 being provided for a Personal Air Vehicle Challenge in 2007.

Benefits 

The U.S. Department of Transportation (DOT) states that  of gasoline are wasted in traffic jams each year.

A future system of travel by PAVs might avoid air traffic jams and could help to relieve those on highways.

Barriers

Air traffic control
The Federal Aviation Administration (FAA) infrastructure is not currently capable of handling the increase in aircraft traffic that would be generated by PAVs. The FAA plan to upgrade forms the Next Generation Air Transportation System, planned for 2025. An interim plan is to use smaller airports. Modeling by NASA and others have shown that PAVs using smaller community airports would not interfere with commercial traffic at larger airports. Currently there are over 10,000 public and private small airports in the United States that could be used for this type of transportation. This infrastructure is currently underutilized, used primarily by recreational aircraft.

Noise
Noise from PAVs could also upset communities if they operate near homes and businesses. Without lower noise levels that enable residential landings, any PAV must take off and land at an FAA-controlled airfield, where higher sound levels have been approved.

Studies have explored ways to make helicopters and aircraft less noisy, but noise levels remain high. In 2005 a simple method of reducing noise was identified: Keep aircraft at a higher altitude during landing. This is called a Continuous Descent Approach (CDA).

Range
Many proposed PAV aircraft are based on electric batteries, however they have low range due to the low specific energy of current batteries. This range may be insufficient to provide adequate safety margin to find a landing site in an emergency.

Fuel cell aircraft have been proposed as a solution to this issue, owing to the much higher specific energy of hydrogen.

Safety 
Urban flight safety is a well-known problem for regulators and industry. On May 16, 1977, the New York Airways accident of a Sikorsky S-61 helicopter shuttle from John F. Kennedy International Airport, which landed on the roof of the Pan Am Building (now MetLife Building) when a landing gear collapsed and a detached rotor blade killed several people on the helipad and one woman on Madison Avenue, ending that business for decades almost around the world. Current helicopter accident rates would be insufficient for urban mobility. The Sikorsky S-92's safety-focused design still allows one fatal accident per million flight hours. This rate would lead to 150 accidents per year for 50,000 eVTOLs flying 3,000 hours a year.

For Sikorsky Innovations, the emerging $30 billion urban air mobility market needs safety at least as good as FAR Part 29 governing over  helicopters.
By May 2018, Sikorsky flew an S-76 120 hours with full point-to-point, real time autonomous flight and terrain avoidance the hard way, with Level A software and redundancy, with a safety pilot. Sikorsky Aircraft want to reach a vertical flight safety of one failure per 10 million hours on high-utilization platforms by combining current rotorcraft experience with advances in autonomous flight, airspace integration and electric propulsion.

Studies
The European Union is funding a 3-leg €4.2m study (under the Seventh Framework Programme) of technologies and impacts for PAVs; Human-aircraft interaction, Automation of aerial systems in cluttered environments, and Exploring the socio-technological environment.

Progress

Fulfillment of the NASA vision for PAVs is likely to unfold over several decades.  Several vehicle types exist which strive to meet the PAV definition:

 Roadable aircraft
 Ultralight Helicopters
 Light Sport Aircraft
 Autogyros
 Ultralight trikes (powered hang gliders with motorized wheels)
 Powered paragliders
 Motor gliders
 Vertical Take-Off and Landing Aircraft

Most vehicles in the above category do not meet all the requirements set by NASA. However, some vehicles come close. Ultrallight aircraft are of special interest since their energy usage is low. Hybrid forms of the vehicle types above can also be useful. Some hybrid forms that exist are:
 the Opener Blackfly, an automated, electrically-powered personal VTOL with good energy efficiency.
 the AeroVironment SkyTote, a combination of airplane and a helicopter. It is also fully automated, similar to driverless cars.
 The Ornithopter, a similar helicopter/ornithopter hybrid.
 The Theolia Windream One and Hunt Aviation have come up with airship hybrids. Airships may also be foreseen with ground effect modifications.
 The Solar Impulse and the electric airplane feature all-electric propulsion.

Autonomy

Besides the fabrication of personal air vehicles, the creation of autonomous systems for PAVs is also being researched. First off, synthetic vision electronic flight instrument systems (EFIS) as Highway in the sky (HITS) makes it much easier to control aircraft. Also, Phantom Works is working on designing a system that allows to automate PAVs. The PAVs are designated their own "lanes" in the sky, thereby ensuring the avoidance of possible collisions. In addition, the different PAVs are also capable of detecting each other and communicating with each other, further decreasing the risk of collisions.

PAV challenge

NASA Langley has researched and prototyped the necessary PAV technologies and has dedicated the largest cash prize in the history of GA to the PAV that can demonstrate the best overall combination of performance. The PAV flight competition for this prize, known as the first annual PAV Challenge, was held Aug 4-12, 2007 and hosted the CAFE Foundation in Santa Rosa, California.

In 2008 the challenge was renamed as the General Aviation Technology Challenge.

The new prizes were:

 The Community Noise Prize ($150,000)
 The Green Prize ($50,000) (MPG)
 The Aviation Safety Prize ($50,000) (Handling, eCFI)
 The CAFE 400 Prize ($25,000) (Speed)
 The Quietest LSA Prize ($10,000)

The winners were:

Community Noise Lambada N109UA $20,000
Green Prize no winner n/a
CAFE Safety Pipistrel N2471P $50,000
CAFE 400 Pipistrel N2471P $2,000
Quietest LSA Lambada N109UA $10,000
Shortest Takeoff Pipistrel N2471P $3,750
Best Angle of Climb Pipistrel N2471P $3,750
Best Glide Ratio at 100 MPH Flightdesign CTSW N135CT $3,750
Cabin Noise (tie) Lambada N109UA Pipistrel N2471P $3,750 ($1,875 each)

Other notable designs

List of Personal Air Vehicles with VTOL capability

 Boeing PAV
 Kitty Hawk Flyer
 Varuna by Sagar Defence Engineering
 Ehang Passenger drone
 Hoversurf Scorpion 3 hoverbike
 CarterCopter / Carter PAV
 Lilium Jet
 Terrafugia Transition
 Terrafugia TF-X
 Xplorair PX200
 Parajet Skycar
 Urban Aeronautics X-Hawk
 NASA Puffin
 Martin Jetpack
 Moller Skycar
 Volocopter 2X

See also

 Comparison of personal air vehicles
 Flying car

References

Further reading

Reports 

 
 
 
 

 
Personal air vehicle
2000s neologisms
2003 neologisms